Taejong of Joseon (13 June 1367 – 8 June 1422), personal name Yi Bang-won (Korean: 이방원; Hanja: 李芳遠), was the third ruler of the Joseon dynasty of Korea and the father of King Sejong the Great. Before ascending to the throne, he was known as Prince Jeongan (Korean: 정안군; Hanja: 靖安君).

Biography

Founding of Joseon 
Born in 1367 as the fifth son of King Taejo and Queen Sinui, he qualified as an official of the Goryeo dynasty in 1382. During his early days, he helped his father in earning the support of the citizens and of many influential figures in the government. Yi Bang-won helped his father in the founding of the new dynasty by assassinating powerful officials such as Jeong Mong-ju, who remained loyal to Goryeo. He was called Prince Jeongan during the reign of King Taejo and was taught by Confucian scholars including Won Cheon-seok.

Strifes of princes 
After helping in the overthrowing the previous dynasty and the establishment of Joseon, he expected to be appointed as the successor to the throne. However, his father and Chief State Councillor Jeong Do-jeon favored Taejo's eighth son and Yi Bang-won's half-brother (second son of Queen Sindeok), Yi Bang-seok, as the crown prince. This conflict arose chiefly because Jeong Do-jeon, as the principal architect of the ideological, institutional and legal foundations of the new dynasty, saw Joseon as a kingdom led by its ministers through appointment by the king. In contrast, Yi Bang-won sought direct rule through an absolute monarchy. These differences ultimately contributed to an environment of deep political tension. Following the sudden death of Queen Sindeok in 1398, Yi Bang-won led a coup d'état while King Taejo was in mourning for his second wife. This event led to the deaths of Jeong Do-jeon and his supporters, as well as the late Queen Sindeok's two sons including the crown prince. The incident became known as the "First Strife of Princes".

Aghast at the fact that his sons were willing to kill each other for the crown, and psychologically exhausted from the death of his second wife, King Taejo abdicated and immediately crowned his second son (the oldest-surviving son) Yi Bang-gwa, or King Jeongjong, as the new ruler. One of King Jeongjong's first acts as monarch was to revert the capital to Gaegyeong (modern-day Kaesong), where he is believed to have been considerably more comfortable. Yet Yi Bang-won retained real power and was soon in conflict with his disgruntled older brother Yi Bang-gan, Prince Hoean (회안군 이방간), who also yearned for power. In 1400, General Park Bo, who was disappointed that Yi Bang-won did not reward him enough for his actions in the First Strife of Princes, allied with Yi Bang-gan and rebelled in what came to be known as the "Second Strife of Princes". Yi Bang-won successfully defeated his brother's forces, then executed Park Bo and sent Yi Bang-gan into exile. King Jeongjong, who was afraid of his powerful brother, named Yi Bang-won as crown prince and abdicated in the same year. Yi Bang-won assumed the throne of Joseon at long last as King Taejong, the third monarch of the Joseon dynasty.

Consolidation of royal power 
In the beginning of Taejong's reign, his father Taejo refused to relinquish the royal seal that signified the legitimacy of any king's rule. Taejong began to initiate policies he believed would prove his qualification to rule. One of his first acts as king was to abolish the privilege enjoyed by the upper echelons of government and the aristocracy to maintain private armies. His revoking of such rights to field independent forces effectively severed their ability to muster large-scale revolts, and drastically increased the number of men employed in the national military. Taejong's next act as king was to revise the existing legislation concerning the taxation of land ownership and the recording of state of subjects. With the discovery of previously hidden land, national income increased twofold.

He also initiated the system of hopae, an early form of identification recording the bearer's name and residence, used to control the movement of people. He also set a big drum in front of the palace, so the common people, when they had some problems, could come and consult the king.

Movable type 
Taejong is remembered for ordering 100,000 pieces of metal type and two complete fonts in 1403. Predating Gutenberg and Laurens Janszoon by several decades, he accomplished the metal movable type.

Absolute monarchy 
In addition, he created a strong central government and an absolute monarchy. In 1399, Taejong had played an influential role in scrapping the Dopyeong Assembly, a council of the old government administration that held a monopoly in court power during the waning years of the Goryeo dynasty, in favor of the State Council of Joseon, a new branch of central administration that revolved around the king and his edicts. After passing the subject documentation and taxation legislation, King Taejong issued a new decree in which all decisions passed by the State Council could only come into effect with the approval of the king. This ended the custom of court ministers and advisors making decisions through debate and negotiations amongst themselves, and thus brought the royal power to new heights. Shortly thereafter, Taejong installed an office, known as the Sinmun Office, to hear cases in which aggrieved subjects felt that they had been exploited or treated unjustly by government officials or aristocrats.

However, Taejong kept Jeong Do-jeon's reforms intact for the most part. He promoted Confucianism, which was more like a political philosophy rather than a religion, thus demoting Buddhism, which was far from daily living and decayed from the power given by Goryeo. He closed many temples that were established by Goryeo kings, and seized their large possessions and added them to the national treasury. Meanwhile, he honored Jeong Mong-ju with the posthumous title of Chief State Councillor (equivalent to Prime Minister), even though it was he who assassinated Jeong — leading to an irony of history, in which Jeong Do-jeon was vilified throughout the Joseon dynasty while Jeong Mong-ju was honored despite his opposition to its foundation.

In foreign policy, he was a straight hardliner — he attacked the Jurchens on the northern border and Japanese pirates on the southern coast. Taejong is also known for being responsible for the Ōei Invasion of Tsushima Island in 1419.

He promoted publications, commerce and education, and also gave full independence and encouraged the Uigeumbu (roughly equivalent to the Supreme Court).

In 1418, Taejong abdicated and gave the throne to his third legitimate son Yi Do (Sejong the Great), but continued to rule with an iron fist and deciding important matters. He executed or exiled some of the supporters who helped him ascend to the throne and later expected favors, in order to strengthen the royal authority and subdue corruption. In order to limit the influence of in-laws and powerful clans, he executed Sejong's father-in-law Shim On and his younger brother Shim Jeong, as well as all four brothers of his wife Queen Wongyeong, after he discovered they and the queen had been manipulating politics.

Taejong remains a controversial figure who killed many of his rivals (including Jeong Mong-ju and Jeong Do-jeon) and yet ruled effectively to improve the populace's lives, strengthen national defense, and lay down a solid foundation for his successor Sejong's rule.

Family 
Father: King Taejo of Joseon (조선 태조) (4 November 1335 – 27 June 1408)
Grandfather: Yi Ja-chun, King Hwanjo of Joseon (조선 환조 이자춘) (1315 – 1 January 1361)
Grandmother: Queen Uihye of the Yeongheung Choe clan (의혜왕후 최씨)
Mother: Queen Sinui of the Cheongju Han clan (신의왕후 한씨) (September 1337 – 21 October 1391)
Grandfather: Han Gyeong (한경)
Grandmother: Lady Shin of the Saknyeong Shin clan (삭녕 신씨)
Consorts and their respective issue(s):
 Queen Wongyeong of the Yeoheung Min clan (원경왕후 민씨) (11 July 1365 – 10 July 1420)
 Princess Jeongsun (정순공주) (1385 – 25 August 1460), first daughter
 Princess Gyeongjeong (경정공주) (1387 – 6 June 1455), second daughter
 First son
 Second son
 Third son
 Princess Gyeongan (경안공주) (1393 – 30 May 1415), third daughter
 Yi Je, Grand Prince Yangnyeong (양녕대군 이제) (1394 – 7 September 1462), first (fourth) son
 Yi Bo, Grand Prince Hyoryeong (효령대군 이보) (6 January 1396 – 12 June 1486), second (fifth) son
 Yi Do, Grand Prince Chungnyeong (충녕대군 이도) (15 May 1397 – 8 April 1450), third (sixth) son
 Princess Jeongseon (정선공주) (1404 – 25 February 1424), fifth daughter
 Yi Jong, Grand Prince Seongnyeong (성녕대군 이종) (3 August 1405 – 11 April 1418), sixth (eleventh) son
 Eleventh (sixteenth) son (1412 – 1412)
 Royal Noble Consort Myeong of the (old) Andong Gim clan (명빈 김씨) (? – 1479)
 Royal Noble Consort Ui of the Andong Gwon clan (의빈 권씨)
 Princess Jeonghye (정혜옹주) (? – 1424), sixth daughter
 Royal Noble Consort Hyo of the Cheongpung Gim clan (효빈 김씨) (? – 1454)
 Yi Bi, Prince Gyeongnyeong (경녕군 이비) (13 December 1402 – 9 September 1458), fourth (eighth) son
 Royal Noble Consort Shin of the Yeongwol Shin clan (신빈 신씨) (? – 1435)
 Yi In, Prince Hamnyeong (함녕군 이인) (1402 – 1467), fifth (ninth) son
 Yi Jeong, Prince Onnyeong (온녕군 이정) (1407 – 1453), seventh (twelfth) son
 Princess Jeongshin (정신옹주) (? – 26 September 1452), seventh daughter
 Princess Jeongjeong (정정옹주) (1410 – 1456), eighth daughter
 Princess Sukjeong (숙정옹주) (? – 1456), ninth daughter
 Princess Suknyeong (숙녕옹주), eleventh (twelfth) daughter
 Princess Soshin (소신옹주) (? – 1437), twelfth (thirteenth) daughter
 Princess Sosuk (소숙옹주) (? – 1456), fourteenth (fifteenth) daughter
 Princess Sukgyeong (숙경옹주) (1420 – 1494), seventeenth (eighteenth) daughter
 Royal Noble Consort Seon of the Sunheung Ahn clan (선빈 안씨) (? – 1468)
 Yi Jeong, Prince Hyenyeong (혜령군 이정) (1407 – 1440), eighth (thirteenth) son
 Yi Chi, Prince Iknyeong (익녕군 이치) (1422 – 1464), thirteenth (eighteenth) son
 Princess Gyeongshin (경신옹주), thirteenth (fourteenth) daughter
 Princess Sukan (숙안옹주) (? – 1464), fifteenth (sixteenth) daughter
 Royal Noble Consort So of the Jangyeon No clan (소빈 노씨) (? – 1479)
 Princess Sukhye (숙혜옹주) (1413 – 1464), tenth (eleventh) daughter
 Royal Noble Consort Jeong of the Go clan (정빈 고씨) (? – 1426)
 Yi Nong, Prince Geunnyeong (근녕군 이농) (1411 – 1462), ninth (fourteenth) son
 Royal Consort Sug-ui of the Choe clan (숙의 최씨)
 Fourth daughter (1400 – 1402)
 Yi Ta, Prince Huinyeong (희령군 이타) (1412 – 7 July 1465), tenth (fifteenth) son
 Royal Lady Suggong of the Cheongdo Gim clan (숙공궁주 김씨)
 Royal Lady Uijeong of the Hanyang Jo clan (의정궁주 조씨) (? – 1454)
 Royal Lady Hyesun of the Goseong Yi clan (혜순궁주 이씨) (? – 1438)
 Royal Lady Sinsun of the Seongju Yi clan (신순궁주 이씨) (1390 – ?)
 Princess Deoksuk of the Yi clan (덕숙옹주 이씨)
 Yi Gan, Prince Hunyeong (후령군 이간) (1419 – 6 October 1450), twelfth (seventeenth) son
 Princess Hyeseon of the Hong clan (혜선옹주 홍씨)
 Princess Sunhye of the Andong Jang clan (순혜옹주 장씨) (? – 26 July 1423)
 Princess Seogyeong (서경옹주)
 Concubine Gim (후궁 김씨)
 Princess Sukgeun (숙근옹주) (? – 1450), sixteenth (seventeenth) daughter
 Lady Yi (이씨)
 Princess Suksun (숙순옹주) (1421 – 1481), eighteenth (nineteenth) daughter

Ancestry

In popular culture 
 Im Hyuk-joo in the 1983 KBS1 TV series Foundation of the Kingdom.
 Lee Jung-gil in the 1983 MBC TV series The King of Chudong Palace.
 Yoo Dong-geun in the 1996–1998 KBS1 TV series Tears of the Dragon.
 Kim Yeong-cheol in the 2008 KBS TV series The Great King, Sejong and the 2016 KBS1 TV series Jang Yeong-sil.
 Baek Yoon-sik in the 2011 SBS TV series Deep Rooted Tree.
 Choi Tae-joon in the 2012–2013 SBS TV series The Great Seer.
 Park Yeong-gyu in the 2012 film I Am the King.
 Ahn Jae-mo in the 2014 KBS1 TV series Jeong Do-jeon.
 Ahn Nae-sang in the 2015 JTBC TV series More Than a Maid.
 Jang Hyuk in the 2015 film Empire of Lust and the 2019 JTBC TV series My Country: The New Age.
 Nam Da-reum and Yoo Ah-in in the 2015–2016 SBS TV series Six Flying Dragons.
 Kam Woo-sung in the 2021 SBS TV series Joseon Exorcist.
 Joo Sang-wook in the 2021–2022 KBS1 TV series The King of Tears, Lee Bang-won.

See also 
 List of monarchs of Korea
 Cheonsang Yeolcha Bunyajido
 Chen Yanxiang (a Chinese merchant from Java that Taejong hosted during his reign)

References 

1367 births
1422 deaths
15th-century Korean monarchs
Korean Buddhist monarchs
People from Hamhung